Pertusaria ambigua is a lichen in the family Pertusariaceae, and found in New South Wales, growing on trees.

It was first described in 2013 by Alan Archer and Jack Elix.

References

External links
What is a lichen?, Australian National Botanical Garden

ambigua
Lichen species
Lichens of Australia
Lichens described in 2013
Taxa named by Alan W. Archer
Taxa named by John Alan Elix